Órzola is a village in the municipality of Haría on the island of Lanzarote in the Canary Islands. It is the northernmost settlement of the island. As of 2021, it has a population of 352 inhabitants.

The port of Órzola is the departure point for the ferries to the island of La Graciosa.

References 

Populated places in Lanzarote